The Drug Trafficking Vessel Interdiction Act of 2008, was an act of the United States Congress outlawing operation of or travel in unregistered submersibles and semi-submersibles in international waters with the intent to evade detection.

The act was enacted to combat the use of illicit self-propelled semi-submersible and submersible vessels in international drug trafficking (see narco-submarine). Notably, the act provides for extraterritorial jurisdiction. The law extended earlier legislation such as the Marijuana on the High Seas Act (MHSA) and Maritime Drug Law Enforcement Act (MDLEA).

Notes

References
 

Acts of the 110th United States Congress
United States federal admiralty and maritime legislation
United States federal criminal legislation
United States federal defense and national security legislation
United States federal controlled substances legislation